Ricardo Cavalcante Mendes (born September 4, 1989), or simply Ricardinho, is a Brazilian footballer who plays as a striker or left winger for Sheriff Tiraspol.

Club career

Górnik Łęczna
In February 2011, he was loaned to Górnik Łęczna on a half-year deal.

Sheriff Tiraspol
Ricardinho joined Sheriff Tiraspol on 1 July 2013, for a fee of 350,000 euros. During the first half of the 2014–15 Moldovan National Division season, Ricardinho scored 11 goals in 14 games, but, due to the withdrawal of Veris Chișinău and Costuleni from the league, Ricardinho's goals against these teams were canceled. As a result, 2 goals were stripped off from Ricardinho's total goal tally.

Al-Sharjah loan
On 21 January 2016, Ricardinho moved to UAE Arabian Gulf League side Al-Sharjah on loan,
returning to Sheriff Tiraspol on 5 July 2016.

Red Star Belgrade
On 16 June 2017, Ricardinho signed a two-year deal with Red Star Belgrade, choosing number 89 on his jersey. He made his Red Star debut in a 3–0 win against Floriana. He stayed in the club for only half of a season and played 10 matches and scored 1 goal in total. Ricardinho was released in December 2017 after being injured for most of the season.

Tosno
On 11 January 2018, Ricardinho signed a 1.5-year contract with the Russian Premier League club FC Tosno. He came off the bench as Tosno won the 2017–18 Russian Cup final against FC Avangard Kursk on 9 May 2018 in the Volgograd Arena.

Sheriff Tiraspol Return
On 11 March 2023, Ricardinho returned to [[[FC Sheriff Tiraspol|Sheriff Tiraspol]].

Career statistics

Notes

Honours
Sheriff Tiraspol	
Moldovan National Division: 2013–14, 2016–17
Moldovan Cup: 2014–15, 2016–17
Moldovan Super Cup: 2015

Tosno
 Russian Cup: 2017–18

References

External links
 
 
 
 
 

1989 births
Living people
Brazilian footballers
Footballers from São Paulo
Brazilian expatriate footballers
Moldovan Super Liga players
Mogi Mirim Esporte Clube players
Esporte Clube Santo André players
Górnik Łęczna players
Wisła Płock players
Lechia Gdańsk players
Sharjah FC players
FC Sheriff Tiraspol players
FC Tosno players
Khor Fakkan Sports Club players
ŁKS Łódź players
Association football midfielders
Expatriate footballers in Poland
Expatriate footballers in Moldova
Expatriate footballers in the United Arab Emirates
Expatriate footballers in Serbia
Expatriate footballers in Russia
Brazilian expatriate sportspeople in Poland
Brazilian expatriate sportspeople in Moldova
Brazilian expatriate sportspeople in the United Arab Emirates
Brazilian expatriate sportspeople in Serbia
Red Star Belgrade footballers
UAE Pro League players
Russian Premier League players
Ekstraklasa players
I liga players